Nina Marie Roth ( Spatola; born July 21, 1988) is a retired American curler from McFarland, Wisconsin. She was the skip of the American women's team at the 2018 Winter Olympics and the third at the 2022 Winter Olympics.

Career
Roth began curling in 1998 and six years later played in her first United States Junior National Championship. She would compete in five more Junior Nationals, winning the title in 2006 and 2008. As a member of the Junior Championship team, she qualified for two World Junior Curling Championships. Skipping the teams both times, she finished tenth at the 2006 Jeonju, Korea Worlds and seventh at the 2008 Östersund, Sweden Worlds.

Roth's senior career began in 2009 as the third for Erika Brown's team. They qualified for the 2009 US Nationals, where they placed fourth.

Roth returned to the United States Nationals in March 2010, where Team Brown won the National Championship, earning the right to compete as Team USA at the 2010 Swift Current World Championships. There they lost in a tiebreaker match, settling for fifth place.  In her last season as a member of the Brown rink, the team would finish in fourth place at 2011 Nationals. On the World Curling Tour, the Roth rink played in three Grand Slam events making it as far as the quarterfinals at the 2010 Sobeys Slam.

In 2011, Roth joined the Patti Lank rink as third. They finished in eighth place at the 2012 United States Women's Curling Championship. They played in just one Grand Slam that season, the 2011 Curlers Corner Autumn Gold Curling Classic, failing to qualify. Elsewhere on the tour, the team won the St. Paul Cash Spiel. The following season, Roth moved to play second on the team. The team played in the 2013 United States Women's Curling Championship and finished in fifth place after losing in a tiebreaker. Also that season, the team defended their title at the St. Paul Cash Spiel.

At the start of the 2013–14 curling season, Roth joined Becca Hamilton's rink as their skip, and Hamilton throwing third stones. The team would win the 2014 United States Women's Curling Championship but did not have enough tour points to represent the United States at that year's World Championship. The following season, Jamie Sinclair was added as the team's third, Hamilton moved to play second, and Tara Peterson was added at lead position. The team had less success at the 2015 United States Women's Curling Championship, just missing the playoffs with a 4–5 record. The team played in two slams on the tour but missed the playoffs in both.

In 2015 Roth formed a new team consisting of Monica Walker, Aileen Sormunen, and Vicky Persinger. The team made it to the finals of the 2016 United States Women's Curling Championship, where they lost to Roth's former skip, Erika Brown. The following season, Becca Hamilton returned to the team to play lead, Geving was moved to second, and Tabitha Peterson was added to play third. The team lost in the finals at the 2017 Nationals to Jamie Sinclair. However, they had enough points on the tour to represent the United States at the 2017 World Women's Curling Championship. There they just missed the playoffs, finishing with a 6–5 record. On the tour, they won one event, the Molson Cash Spiel. That season the team also represented the United States at the 2017 Americas Challenge, where they easily beat Brazil to qualify the U.S. for the 2017 Worlds.

The team would get the best of Sinclair at the 2017 United States Olympic Curling Trials, where they defeated the Sinclair rink in the final, winning the right to represent the United States at the 2018 Winter Olympics. There Roth led the United States to a 4–5 record, missing the playoffs. Because they played in the Olympics, Team Roth opted to skip the 2018 US Nationals. On the tour that season they won the Canad Inns Women's Classic and played in two slams, making it as far as the quarterfinals at the 2018 Players' Championship.

Team Roth attempted to defend their title at the 2019 United States Women's Curling Championship but lost out to Team Sinclair in the final. They had better luck on the Grand Slam tour, making it to the semifinals of the 2018 Tour Challenge and the 2019 Canadian Open. Her team also represented the United States in the First Leg and the Grand Final of the 2018–19 Curling World Cup, finishing with a 3–3 and 2–4 record respectively.

The team's first World Curling Tour event of the 2019–20 season was the 2019 AMJ Campbell Shorty Jenkins Classic, where they missed the playoffs. The following week, they won the Beyer & Simonson US Open of Curling. They also won their next event, the 2019 WCT Uiseong International Curling Cup, defeating Kim Eun-jung in the final. Roth missed most of the season while on maternity leave, with Tabitha Peterson skipping the team. During the 2020 off-season, the team announced that Peterson would remain as skip when Roth returned from maternity leave. Roth re-joined the team as vice-skip at third, with Hamilton moving to second, Tara Peterson to lead, and Geving to alternate.

Due to the COVID-19 pandemic, the Peterson team did not compete in events for most of the 2020–21 season until entering a bio-secure bubble held in Calgary, Alberta in the spring of 2021 for three events in a row. The first two events were the Champions Cup and Players' Championship grand slams, with the team missing the playoffs at both. The third event in the Calgary bubble for Team Peterson was the 2021 World Women's Championship, in which they earned a spot as 2020 National Champions after the 2021 National Championship was moved to later in the spring due to the pandemic. They finished the 13-game round-robin in fifth place with a 7–6 record, earning them a spot in the playoffs and securing a 2022 Olympic berth for the United States. In the playoffs, Team Peterson defeated Denmark's Madeline Dupont but lost to Switzerland's Silvana Tirinzoni to end up in the bronze medal game. There, Peterson faced off against Sweden's Anna Hasselborg and won with a score of 9–5, including scoring five points in the seventh end. Team Peterson's bronze medal finish was the first World Women's medal for the United States in 15 years, and the first-ever bronze medal.

The Peterson rink won their first two events of the 2021–22 season, the US Open of Curling and the 2021 Curlers Corner Autumn Gold Curling Classic. The following week, they played in the 2021 Masters where they made it as far as the quarterfinals. The team then played in the 2021 United States Olympic Curling Trials, where they attempted to return to the Olympics. Through the round robin, the team posted a 9–1 record, putting them into the best-of-three final against Cory Christensen. The Peterson rink beat Christensen in two-straight games, booking their tickets to the 2022 Winter Olympics. After the Trials, the team played in one event before the Olympics, the Curl Mesabi Classic, which they won, beating Christensen again in the final. At the Olympics, the team finished the round robin with a 4–5 record, missing the playoffs. The team finished off the season by playing in two Slams, the 2022 Players' Championship and the 2022 Champions Cup, missing the playoffs in both events.

On May 13, 2022, Roth announced that she would be stepping away from competitive curling.

Personal life
Roth earned a nursing degree from Edgewood College and works as a registered nurse. She married Tony Roth in 2014 and they have one child. She is of Italian descent.

Teams

Grand Slam record

Former events

Notes

References

External links

1988 births
American female curlers
Living people
People from McFarland, Wisconsin
Sportspeople from Wisconsin
Continental Cup of Curling participants
Curlers at the 2018 Winter Olympics
Olympic curlers of the United States
American curling champions
21st-century American women
Curlers at the 2022 Winter Olympics